Murulia is a census town in the Santuri CD block in the Raghunathpur subdivision of the Purulia district in the state of West Bengal, India.

Geography

Location

Area overview
Purulia district forms the lowest step of the Chota Nagpur Plateau. The general scenario is undulating land with scattered hills. Raghunathpur subdivision occupies the northern part of the district. 83.80% of the population of the subdivision  lives in rural areas. However, there are pockets of urbanization and 16.20% of the population lives in urban areas. There are 14 census towns in the subdivision. It is presented in the map given alongside. There is a coal mining area around Parbelia and two thermal power plants are there – the 500 MW Santaldih Thermal Power Station and the 1200 MW Raghunathpur Thermal Power Station. The subdivision has a rich heritage of old temples, some of them belonging to the 11th century or earlier. The Banda Deul is a monument of national importance. The comparatively more recent in historical terms, Panchkot Raj has interesting and intriguing remains in the area.

Note: The map alongside presents some of the notable locations in the subdivision. All places marked in the map are linked in the larger full screen map.

Demographics
According to the 2011 Census of India, Murulia had a total population of 5,929, of which 3,090 (52%) were males and 2,839 (48%) were females. There were 1,314 persons in the age range of 0–6 years. The total number of literate persons in Murulia was 2,371 (51.38% of the population over 6 years).

Infrastructure
According to the District Census Handbook 2011, Puruliya, Murulia covered an area of 3.9068 km2. There is a railway station at Muraddi, 6 km away. Among the civic amenities, the protected water supply involved hand pumps. It had 347 domestic electric connections. Among the medical facilities it had 1 dispensaries/ health centres, 1 family welfare centre, 1 maternity and child welfare centre, 4 medicine shops. Among the educational facilities it had were 2 primary schools, the nearest middle school, the nearest secondary school, the nearest senior secondary school, all at Muraddi, the nearest degree college at Asansol 35 km away. Three important commodities it manufactured were paddy, puffed rice and beedi.

Healthcare
Muraddi Rural Hospital, with 30 beds at Muraddi, is the major government medical facility in the Santuri CD block.

Ramchandrapur Netaji Eye and General Hospital, at Ramchandrapur, functioning under the Health and Family Welfare department of the Government of West Bengal, established in 1953, is a 242 bedded eye care institution.  10,790 patients are treated in-door annually and 130,000 patients attend the Out Patient's Department.

References

Cities and towns in Purulia district